Epimelitta meliponica is a species of beetle in the family Cerambycidae. It was described by Bates in 1870.

References

Epimelitta
Beetles described in 1870